Anjali Mukhi is an Indian television actress. She is best known as Sudha in Saas Bina Sasural and Saroj Singh in Doli Armaano Ki.

Career
Anjali Mukhi made her television debut with Khwaish on Sony TV.
She was last seen in I Luv My India as Simran on Life OK, as Sudha Lalit Sharma in Saas Bina Sasural on Sony TV and as Maithali in Chhanchhan on Sony TV. She played the role of Saroj Singh, Urmi's mother, in Doli Armaano Ki on Zee TV. She also played the role of Mrs Kamini Malhotra, Pushkar's mother, in Sony TV's Ek Duje Ke Vaaste.
Later, she played the role of Nayantara in the StarPlus show Ishqbaaz.
Between 2009 and 2010, she played the role of Leela Arvind Thakkar in the second season of the serial Baa Bahoo Aur Baby replacing Lubna Salim, but the show soon went off air.  She played  in Naati Pinky Ki Lambi Love Story as Mrs.Vankatraman.  Currently, she is seen in Yeh Hai Chahatein as Sulochana Khurana , the main protagonist's mother-in-law.

Filmography

Television

References

External links

Living people
Indian soap opera actresses
Indian television actresses
Year of birth missing (living people)
Actresses from Mumbai